Omegamon may refer to:
 Omnimon, a Digimon
 IBM OMEGAMON, a software bundle